The 1919 New South Wales Rugby Football League premiership was the twelfth season of Sydney’s professional rugby league club competition, Australia’s first. Eight teams from across the city contested during the season, with Balmain finishing on top of the ladder to claim the premiership.

Season summary
Balmain and Eastern Suburbs dominated the 14-round season, dropping just two and three games respectively. Balmain were undefeated after eight rounds but a mid-year Australian tour to New Zealand saw the black and golds lose their representative stars and their lead was lost to Eastern Suburbs for one week late in the season.

With eleven rounds played, Balmain led Eastern Suburbs by one point on the ladder but relinquished this lead by losing their round 12 match against Glebe as Eastern Suburbs beat winless Annandale 28–0. This meant Eastern Suburbs now led by one point with two rounds to play. However, they lost the very next round 15–12 to South Sydney, who had won just four of their twelve previous matches. Meanwhile, Balmain managed to beat Newtown 18–5, giving them the one point advantage heading into the final round.

The final match of the season turned out to be the decider for the premiership, with the top two teams playing one another at the Royal Agricultural Society Ground. The winner of the match would take out the premiership, whilst a draw would give Balmain the title. At the end of the day, it was the goal kicking of Balmain's Les Wall that secured the premiership, with a 13–4 win over Eastern Suburbs. Five of Wall’s attempts hit the post that day, but four crossed the bar and won Balmain the title. Members of the Balmain premiership winning side included Bob Craig and Bill Kelly.

The City Cup was won by Wests for the second consecutive season.

Teams
The teams remained unchanged from the 1918 season

 Annandale
 Balmain, formed on January 23, 1908, at Balmain Town Hall
 Eastern Suburbs, formed on January 24, 1908, at Paddington Town Hall
 Glebe, formed on January 9, 1908
 Newtown, formed on January 14, 1908
 North Sydney, formed on February 7, 1908
 South Sydney, formed on January 17, 1908, at Redfern Town Hall
 Western Suburbs, formed on February 4, 1908

Ladder

References

External links
 Rugby League Tables - Notes AFL Tables
 Rugby League Tables - Season 1919 AFL Tables
 Premiership History and Statistics RL1908
 Results: 1911-20 at rabbitohs.com.au

New South Wales Rugby League premiership
NSWRFL season